David Kenyon Webster (2 June 1922 – disappeared 9 September 1961) was an American soldier, journalist and author. During World War II he was a private with E Company, 2nd Battalion, 506th Parachute Infantry Regiment, in the 101st Airborne Division. Webster was portrayed in the HBO miniseries Band of Brothers by Eion Bailey.

Youth
Webster was born in New York City of English and Scottish descent. He was educated at The Taft School, Watertown, Connecticut, then enrolled as an English literature major at Harvard University. In 1942, he volunteered for the paratroopers before finishing his degree.  He used his middle name while addressing his family in his letters to home rather than his first name, David.

Military service
Webster trained with Fox Company of the 2nd Battalion at Camp Toccoa. He parachuted into France on D-Day with Headquarters Company of the 2nd Battalion, then requested a transfer to Easy Company, with which he served until his discharge in 1945.

On D-Day, Webster landed nearly alone and off-course in flooded fields behind Utah Beach, and was wounded a few days later. A few months later, he parachuted into the Netherlands as part of Operation Market Garden. After Market Garden failed, the company shifted toward Arnhem. During an attack in the no-man's land called "the Island" (also referred to as "The Crossroads"), he was wounded in the leg by machine gun fire. He was evacuated to a hospital and spent the next several months recuperating in England.

Released by the hospital in February 1945, Webster rejoined his unit. What he found was a regiment decimated by combat in the Battle of the Bulge, exhausted, weary and bitter over his absence and the loss of friends. Soon thereafter, Easy Company discovered their first concentration camp, the Kaufering concentration camp complex.

Author Stephen Ambrose wrote of Webster: "He had long ago made it a rule of his Army life never to do anything voluntarily. He was an intellectual, as much an observer and chronicler of the phenomenon of soldiering as a practitioner. He was almost the only original Toccoa man who never became an NCO. Various officers wanted to make him a squad leader, but he refused. He was there to do his duty, and he did it — he never let a buddy down in combat, in France, Holland, or Germany — but he never volunteered for anything and he spurned promotion".

Awards and decorations
His list of authorized medals and decorations are:
  Bronze Star Medal
  Purple Heart with one oak leaf cluster
  Good Conduct Medal
  European-African-Middle Eastern Campaign Medal with Arrowhead and 4 service stars
  World War II Victory Medal
  Army of Occupation Medal
  Presidential Unit Citation with one Oak Leaf Cluster
  Combat Infantryman Badge
  Parachutist Badge with 2 jump stars

Later years
Webster was the last of the surviving Camp Toccoa veterans who had fought in Normandy to be sent home after the surrender of Nazi Germany. When he was discharged in 1945, he returned to work as a reporter for The Wall Street Journal and the Los Angeles Daily News. Webster took up sailing and fishing and made a hobby of studying oceanography and marine biology. During those years he worked on his wartime memoirs and occasionally approached magazines with article proposals related to his war service, but he never attempted to publish a full treatment of his experiences in the 101st Airborne Division.

Webster married Barbara Jean Stoessell in 1952, and had three children. His interest in sharks led him to write a book on the subject entitled Myth and Maneater: The Story of the Shark.

Lost at sea
On September 9, 1961, Webster embarked on a fishing trip in a twelve-foot sailboat, leaving in the morning and planning to come back in the afternoon. When he failed to return, the Coast Guard embarked on a search. Early the following day, commercial fishermen recovered his boat five miles offshore. One oar and a tiller were missing. His wife told the press that Webster went shark-fishing in the small craft and did not use a life preserver. At the time of his death he was employed as a technical writer with System Development Corp.

Legacy
Except for a few short stories in magazines such as the Saturday Evening Post, Webster's wartime diary and thoughts remained unpublished at the time of his death. However, Stephen Ambrose, a tenured University of Louisiana System professor of history (specifically, at the University of New Orleans) who had studied Webster's writings, was so impressed by the historical value of Webster's unpublished papers that the professor encouraged Webster's widow to submit the writing package to LSU Press. She did so, and a book was published, with Ambrose's foreword, by LSU in 1994. Titled Parachute Infantry: An American Paratrooper's Memoir of D-Day and the Fall of the Third Reich, it presented Webster's first-hand account of life as an Airborne infantryman. His trained eye, honesty and writing skills helped give the book as well as the miniseries a color and tone not available in other G.I. diaries. An excerpt: "Since there was little traffic at night, no noncom stood here after dark. He posted his men and slept until time to wake up the relief. I usually left that job to someone reliable like Janovec, for with a gin party every night, I was seldom in condition to wake anybody else up."

The Taft School established an award for excellence in writing in Webster's honor.

See also

List of people who disappeared at sea

References

Bibliography

External links
Official website
"Fling Fever" by David Kenyon Webster, Staff Reporter of The Wall Street Journal

1922 births
1960s missing person cases
1961 deaths
20th-century American male writers
20th-century American memoirists
United States Army personnel of World War II
American male journalists
Band of Brothers characters
Harvard College alumni
Journalists from New York City
Missing person cases in California
Taft School alumni
United States Army soldiers
Deaths by drowning in California
People lost at sea
Military personnel from New York (state)